Ali Ibrahim Abdelaziz (Arabic: علي عبدالعزيز) is an Egyptian mixed martial arts manager. 

Abdelaziz is the founder and president of Dominance MMA Management. Through his company, Abdelaziz manages several former UFC champions, such as Khabib Nurmagomedov, Kamaru Usman, Justin Gaethje and Henry Cejudo, among others. He also manages the PFL's former lightweight champion Kayla Harrison and former featherweight champion Lance Palmer.

Abdelaziz had a brief career as a fighter before he became a manager.

Controversies

Informant work
Abdelaziz was recruited by the New York Police Department to work undercover within a Virginia-based arm of a group called Muslims of America. The NYPD shared Abdelaziz with the FBI, but the federal agency eventually began to suspect he was operating as a double agent, particularly after he was reportedly administered a polygraph examination. This information was popularized in the book Enemies Within, written by American Journalists Adam Goldman and Matt Apuzzo, and was used by Conor McGregor in an attempt to antagonise Abdelaziz at the UFC 229 press conference.

UFC 268 altercation
Abdelaziz was involved in an altercation with Bellator MMA fighter Dillon Danis at UFC 268 on November 6, 2021 where he allegedly slapped Danis backstage at the event.

Mixed martial arts record 

|-
|Loss
|align=center|1–3 
|Caol Uno
|Submission (armbar)
|K-1 HERO'S 8
|
|align=center|1
|align=center|1:58
|Nagoya, Japan
|
|-
|Loss
|align=center|1–2
|Rocky Johnson
|Submission (armbar)
|Ring of Fire 26
|
|align=center|1
|align=center|2:50
|Castle Rock, Colorado, United States
|
|-
|Loss
|align=center|1–1
|Takuhiro Kamikozono
|Submission (heel hook)
|Ring of Fire 19
|
|align=center|1
|align=center|1:11
|Castle Rock, Colorado, United States
|
|-
|Win
|align=center|1–0
|Chee Bates
|Submission (guillotine choke)
|Ring of Fire 12
|
|align=center|1
|align=center|1:44
|Castle Rock, Colorado, United States
|
|-

Submission grappling record

References

Sportspeople from Cairo
Egyptian male mixed martial artists
American male mixed martial artists
Egyptian male judoka
American male judoka
Egyptian practitioners of Brazilian jiu-jitsu
American practitioners of Brazilian jiu-jitsu
People awarded a black belt in Brazilian jiu-jitsu
Mixed martial artists utilizing judo
Mixed martial artists utilizing Brazilian jiu-jitsu
Mixed martial arts executives
1978 births
Living people